The Truth Is... is the second album by British rock band Failsafe and was released on 10 November 2008. The album was recorded in January 2008 at Sandhill Studios in Liverpool and was produced by Pete Miles (who also produced "What We Are Today"). Remixing and mastering was done in the Summer of 2008 before the band agreed independent record deals with  Small Town Records in the UK and Fond Of Life Records in Europe.

"Hope" and "Only If We Learn" were featured in the 2010 video game NBA 2K11.

Artwork
The band were involved in the artwork for the album which features numerous photographs from around Preston and Chorley. With a double centrefold image of Preston Bus Station and front cover shot of Chorley Train Station. All photos and design work were carried out by Martin Cogley.

Singles

Hope
"Hope" is a stand out track from "The Truth Is..." and a video was recorded in Kent on 14/09/08 by Eat The Rich which went on to receive regular rotation on music channels such as MTV2, Kerrang and 4Music. The track was released as a download only single on 03/11/08 with a b-side titled "Tidal Wave" recorded during the album sessions. A MTV2 MySpace poll in late October 2008 saw the single come in at Number 3 for the week's hottest new MySpace tracks, ahead of Fall Out Boy, Kings of Leon and the Kaiser Chiefs.

A Common Goal
"A Common Goal" was released on 06/07/09 through Small Town Records & Bomber Music as a download only single. B-Sides include "Only If We Learn" and two live session tracks recorded for Xfm.
The band's second single proper was accompanied by a video which received regular rotation on Kerrang TV. Tim Fox directed the video which was recorded in Camberwell South London and featured imagery similar in style to the album artwork for "The Truth Is..."

Track listing
 Only If We Learn
 A Common Goal
 Without Warning
 Cities And Headlights
 Hope
 Mirror Mirror
 Deadwood
 Guilt On Dirty Hands
 When Words Run Out
 Help Yourself
 Too Much To Ask

2008 albums